Gennaro "Gerry" Mendicino (born May 18, 1950) is a Canadian actor.

Mendicino was born in North Bay, Ontario, and graduated from the University of Windsor Drama School in 1973. Throughout his career he has been able to play a wide range of versatile characters. He began on the television series King of Kensington and went on to host the popular children's television series Polka Dot Door.  He portrayed Sam Ramone in the television series Ready or Not. His most notable film role came as Uncle Taki in My Big Fat Greek Wedding and My Big Fat Greek Wedding 2.

Filmography

Film

Television

References

External links
 

1950 births
Living people
Canadian male film actors
Canadian male television actors
Canadian male voice actors
People from North Bay, Ontario
Male actors from Ontario
20th-century Canadian male actors
21st-century Canadian male actors